Chala Murari Hero Banne is a 1977 Indian Hindi-language comedy film directed by and starring Asrani.

Plot
Murari dreams of becoming an actor, but his Dad (A.K. Hangal), who runs a cloth shop, wants him to help in the shop. Murari runs away from home and catches a train to Mumbai. On his journey, he meets a teacher who says he knows Raj Kapoor. Murari comes to Mumbai, lives in a chawl, struggles a bit and becomes a successful and rich actor. Then comes a twist in his life; he gets accused in scandals, and his love interest, (Bindiya Goswami), leaves him. Eventually, he proves himself innocent and they reunite and marry.

Cast
G. Asrani as Murari/Amit
Bindiya Goswami as Mary
Ashok Kumar
Prem Nath
Bindu
Paintal
Jagdeep
Keshto Mukherjee as Abdul
Satyendra Kapoor as Dubey/Lyricist

Guest appearances 

The film has many Special appearances including:

Dharmendra
Hema Malini
Premnath
Amitabh Bachchan
A.K. Hangal as Murari's father
Keshto Mukherjee
Jagdeep
Ashok Kumar
Rishi Kapoor
Neetu Singh
Paintal as Peter
David Abraham Cheulkar as Mary's father
Sunil Dutt
Kishore Kumar
Nasir Hussain
Helen
Atal Bihari Vajpayee as Self
Lal Krishna Advani as Self
Harindranath Chattopadhyaya as himself

Music
"Naa Janey Din Kaise Jivan Me Aaye Hain" - Kishore Kumar
"Khoye Ho Aakhir Kis Bekhudi Me" - Asha Bhosle
"Teri Kathputli Hun Naccne Nikli Hu" - Lata Mangeshkar
"Do Pal Ki Hey Ye Zindagani" - Asha Bhosle
"Haathon Me Haath Hum Lekar" - Lata Mangeshkar
"Na Jane Din Kaise Jivan Me Aaye Hai" (II) - Kishore Kumar
"Pas Aao Na" - Asha Bhosle, Simi Garewal

References

External links
 

1977 films
1970s Hindi-language films
Films about Bollywood
Films set in Delhi
Films set in Mumbai
Films scored by R. D. Burman
Films shot in Delhi
Films shot in Mumbai
Atal Bihari Vajpayee